Fjölnir Geir Bragason (5 February 1965 – 11 December 2021) was an Icelandic tattoo artist. Commonly known as Fjölnir Tattoo, he was known as one of Iceland's foremost tattoo artists.

Early life and education
Fjölnir started studying in preschool at the old Stýrimannaskólinn, then went to Breiðagerðisskóli, Hlíðaskóli and graduated from Menntaskólinn við Hamrahlíð in 1990. He graduated from the Icelandic School of Arts and Crafts in 2000, where his dissertation dealt with tattooing, but he had been working in the field since 1995.

Personal life
Fjölnir was the son of artist Bragi Ásgeirsson.

References

1965 births
2021 deaths
Fjolnir Geir Bragason
Fjolnir Geir Bragason
Fjolnir Geir Bragason
Fjolnir Geir Bragason
Tattoo artists